Umar Farooq Tariq Lutfi (born 20 September 1951) is a Pakistani coach and former player. He is the manager of Sui Southern Gas. He played his entire career at Pakistan Airlines. He was also the caretaker manager of the Pakistan national football team in 2011.

Tariq has the distinction of being the first-ever FIFA Coaching Instructor from South Asia. He is the current manager of Sui Southern Gas having previously managed his former club Pakistan Airlines and four times Pakistan Premier League winners Khan Research Laboratories and the former head coach of the Pakistan women's national football team. He was also the manager of Karachi Bazigar in the Geo Super Football League 2007 campaign. Tariq is often described as arguably the most qualified football coach of Pakistan.

Pakistan Airlines

As a player and coach of Pakistan Airlines, Lutfi has led the team to become National Champions a record nine times in the history of Pakistani club football.

Managerial career

Pakistan women football team
Pakistan Football Federation's President Faisal Saleh Hayat had appointed Tariq Lutfi as coach of the Pakistan Women football team in 2010. Tariq coached the team for the first SAFF Women Championship in Bangladesh where the team reached the semi-finals for the first time in history.

Pakistan national team
Tariq Lutfi served as head coach of the Pakistan national team several times from 1985 to 2004, and, under his leadership, Pakistan had gold medal success in the 1989 South Asian Games, as well as in the 1991 South Asian Games and the 2004 South Asian Games. He returned a caretaker coach in 2011 but was replaced by Zaviša Milosavljević.

Khan Research Laboratories
Lutfi was appointed as the head coach for Khan Research Laboratories before the start of 2011-12 Pakistan Premier League season. Lufti went on to become the league title for three consecutive season, winning the league in 2011-12, 2012-13, 2013-14 and finished sixth in 2014-15 season. Lufti also won the Pakistan National Football Challenge Cup on four occasions, winning the competition in 2011 and then successfully defending it in the edition, defeating K-Electric on both occasions in the finals. Lutfi won the cup again in 2015, and went on to defend it in the next edition in 2016.

Sui Southern Gas
In 2017, Lutfi was appointed as the head coach for second division side Sui Southern Gas after a successful tenure with Khan Research Laboratories. Lutfi won three out four silverware they competed for after winning Major Tufail Shaheed Memorial Football Tournament, All Pakistan Salahuddin Dogar Memorial Football Tournament and winning the second division title to achieve the promotion to Pakistan Premier League.

Honours
Tariq Lutfi is widely considered to be the most qualified and successful coach in Pakistan football.  Shazia Hasan of Dawn describes Tariq as "arguably the most-qualified football official in Pakistan". He has several coaching qualifications through Bisham Abbey, Bert Trautmann, Holger Osieck, etc. and has the honour of attending several FIFA and Olympic courses. Tariq has the grand distinction of being the first-ever FIFA Coaching Instructor from South Asia. In 2019, he had the honour of winning the Pakistan Sports Awards for the Best Coach in Pakistan.

Manager

Khan Research Laboratories
 Pakistan Premier League: 2011-12, 2012-13, 2013-14
 Pakistan National Football Challenge Cup: 2011, 2012, 2015, 2016

Sui Southern Gas
 Pakistan Football Federation League: 2017-18

References

External links

 Tariq Lutfi-Powerset

1951 births
Living people
Pakistani footballers
Pakistan international footballers
Pakistani football managers
Pakistan national football team managers
Association football midfielders